Sheila Cameron may refer to:
 Sheila Cameron (artist), American artist
 Sheila Cameron (lawyer) (born 1934), British lawyer and ecclesiastical judge